Malwa Singh (20 March 1946 – 27 April 1990) was an Indian wrestler. He competed in two events at the 1964 Summer Olympics.

References

1946 births
1990 deaths
Indian male sport wrestlers
Olympic wrestlers of India
Wrestlers at the 1964 Summer Olympics
Sport wrestlers from Delhi
Asian Games medalists in wrestling
Wrestlers at the 1962 Asian Games
Asian Games gold medalists for India
Asian Games bronze medalists for India
Medalists at the 1962 Asian Games
Recipients of the Arjuna Award